Bulwell Forest railway station was a former station in Nottingham on the Great Northern Railway Nottingham to Shirebrook line.

The tram stop is situated on the alignment of the former Midland Railway route from Nottingham to Worksop, which is now shared between the NET and the Robin Hood railway line, but there was never a railway station at its location.

References

Disused railway stations in Nottinghamshire
Railway stations in Great Britain opened in 1887
Railway stations in Great Britain closed in 1929
Transport in Nottingham
Former Great Northern Railway stations